Täheke is a children's magazine published in Tallinn, Estonia by Kultuurileht SA.

First number was issued in January 1960.

1960–2005, the magazine was published by Perioodika.

References

External links
About Täheke, kultuurileht.ee 

Magazines published in Estonia
Estonian children's literature